The Minority Report is a re-titled  collection of science fiction stories by Philip K. Dick.  It was  published by Gollancz and Citadel Twilight in 1991, being a reprint of  Volume IV, "The Days of Perky Pat" of The Collected Stories of Philip K. Dick (1987).  The collection The Days of Perky Pat was published in Britain in hardback by Gollancz in 1990 and in paperback by Grafton in 1991.  The stories had originally appeared in the magazines Galaxy Science Fiction, Science Fiction Stories, If, Fantastic Universe, Fantasy and Science Fiction, Fantastic, Worlds of Tomorrow, Escapade and Amazing Stories.

Contents
 How Do You Know You’re Reading Philip K. Dick?, by James Tiptree, Jr
 "Autofac"
 "Service Call"
 "Captive Market"
 "The Mold of Yancy"
 "The Minority Report"
 "Recall Mechanism"
 "The Unreconstructed M"
 "Explorers We"
 "War Game"
 "If There Were No Benny Cemoli"
 "Novelty Act"
 "Waterspider"
 "What the Dead Men Say"
 "Orpheus with Clay Feet"
 "The Days of Perky Pat"
 "Stand-by"
 "What'll We Do with Ragland Park?"
 "Oh, to Be a Blobel!"
 Notes

References

1991 short story collections
Short story collections by Philip K. Dick